The Library Park Historic District in Las Vegas, New Mexico, was listed on the National Register of Historic Places in 1979.

It includes a Carnegie library, the Carnegie Public Library of Las Vegas, which is a cross-plan red brick Classical Revival building with a center dome and a porticoed entrance, designed by architects Isaac H. Rapp and William M. Rapp.

It includes the Immaculate Conception Church (1949), at the southwest corner of the library park, a creme brick Latin cross plan Gothic Revival-style church which was designed by Les J. Wolmagood.

It includes the parish house next door to the church, at 811 6th Street, which is a stuccoed frame house.

It includes 807 N. National, a small gable-front stucco house.

It includes a Gothic cottage at the southwest corner of 6th and National, dating probably to around 1880.

References

National Register of Historic Places in San Miguel County, New Mexico
Victorian architecture in New Mexico
Neoclassical architecture in New Mexico